Ministry of infrastructure (infrastructure ministry) is a primary unit of executive government that is responsible of public infrastructure, such as transport infrastructure.

In some countries there's a separate body responsible of transport infrastructure, Ministry of Transport.

Ministries of infrastructure 
 Canada
 Ministry of Infrastructure of Ontario and Ministry of Transportation of Ontario
 Poland
 Rwanda
 Slovenia

Departments of transportation
In North America the corresponding government body is called the Department of transportation.

 United States Department of Transportation
 Transport Canada

Infrastructure ministries